Rachel Brathen is a Swedish yoga teacher, a pioneer of paddleboard yoga, and the founder of Island Yoga Aruba in the Caribbean. She is the author of the best-selling 2015 book Yoga Girl.

Biography 

Rachel Brathen was born in Sweden on the 5th of October 1988. After graduating from secondary school, she went to Costa Rica to pursue yoga; she lived there for three years, doing yoga daily. In 2010 she travelled to Aruba for a holiday, meeting her future husband Dennis. She returned to Aruba to be with him; they now live there. She was one of the pioneers of Stand-Up Paddleboard Yoga (SUP Yoga); she started teaching it in 2009. She now includes it in all the events that she leads and at festivals such as Wanderlust around the world.

She is an internationally-known teacher of yoga as exercise 
She is the author of the book Yoga Girl, which became a New York Times best-seller in 2015, popularising the line "Yoga every damn day".
"Yoga Girl" is also the name of Brathen's Instagram account. 

Brathen founded a yoga studio called Island Yoga Aruba as well as the yoga video service oneOeight and the non-profit 109 World. 
In 2017, Forbes named Brathen on its list of the most important social media influencers in the fitness category, noting that Brathen can command a $25,000 fee per Instagram post. She is a certified Yoga influencer, with a score of 98 from the influencer marketing software Klear. Brathen launched a podcast in March 2017, which reached the iTunes charts. 
In 2019, she published an autobiography, To love and let go: a memoir of love, loss, and gratitude.

Personal life 

She speaks four languages, Swedish, English, Spanish and Papiamento (spoken on Aruba). She and her husband Dennis live on Aruba, where he administers her yoga business. They married in June 2014, and have a daughter.

See also 

 Yoga in Sweden

References

External links 

 

Living people
Yoga teachers
1988 births
21st-century Swedish women